The timing hypothesis, gap hypothesis, gap theory, or critical window hypothesis for menopausal hormone therapy is a scientific theory that the benefits and risks of menopausal hormone therapy vary depending on the amount of time a woman has been in menopause upon initiation of treatment. More specifically, it is thought that hormone therapy may be protective against coronary heart disease in women who initiate it in early menopause but may be harmful in women who start it in late menopause. The timing hypothesis may also extend to risks of breast cancer and Alzheimer's disease with hormone therapy. It is thought that the increase in breast cancer risk may be greater in women who start hormone therapy in early menopause but may be lower or that even decreased risk of breast cancer may occur in women who start in late menopause. The influence of hormone therapy on depressive symptoms may additionally be influenced by menopausal stage, with significant benefit seen in perimenopausal women but not in postmenopausal women. The timing hypothesis is potentially able to resolve conflicting findings between large observational studies and randomized controlled trials on long-term health outcomes with menopausal hormone therapy.

References

Menopause